Maling is a surname. Notable people with the surname include:

 Arthur Maling (1923–2013), American writer
 George Allan Maling (1888–1929), English doctor and recipient of the Victoria Cross
 Harriet Florence Maling (1918–1987), American pharmacologist
 Joan Maling, American linguist 
 John Allan Maling (1920–2012), British soldier of the Second World War who won the Military Cross
 John Darwin Maling (1915–2009), British Indian Army officer
 Simon Maling (born 1975), New Zealand rugby player
 Thomas James Maling (1778–1849), Royal Navy officer